Off the Rails is a 1921 German silent drama film directed by William Karfiol and starring Wilhelm Diegelmann, Ernst Hofmann and Erra Bognar. The film's sets were designed by the art director Eduard Nickler. It premiered at the Marmorhaus in Berlin.

Cast
 Wilhelm Diegelmann as Wachtmeister a.d. Heilberg
 Ernst Hofmann as Hans Heilberg
 Erra Bognar as Else Heilberg
 Martha Angerstein-Licho
 Charly Berger as Steuermann
 Tessi Nurnberg as Elses Freundin
 Josef Commer
 Colette Corder
 Marie Louise Jürgens
 Adolf E. Licho
 Heinrich Peer

References

Bibliography
 Alfred Krautz. International directory of cinematographers, set- and costume designers in film, Volume 4. Saur, 1984.

External links

1921 films
Films of the Weimar Republic
German silent feature films
Films directed by William Karfiol
German black-and-white films
Films based on German novels
1920s German films